Baytik Kanaev (romanized: Baytik Kanaev)  better known as Baytik Batyr (Chüy Valley — 1886) was a Kyrgyz politician of the 19th century who defended the demands of the Kyrgyz people from the Khanate of Kokand, but at the same time supported the aggressive campaigns of the neighboring Russian Empire in the Chüy Valley.

Biography

Childhood 
Baytik was born in 1820in the Chüy Valley of modern Kyrgyzstan.

Baytik's childhood fell on the beginning of the Kokand expansion. He personally saw the arbitrariness of foreigners, the discontent of his relatives and friends. Baytik grew up as a proud, resolute, strong-willed and courageous young man. He was tall and broad-shouldered.

Baytik was the organizer of all kinds of children's games, races on young bulls, wrestling and other competitions. With his activity and leadership qualities, he drew the attention of his father and the aqsaqals of the tribe.

Kanai Batyr died when Baytik was only 15 years old. Further formation of him as a person was under the influence of his paternal uncle Jangarach Biy, to whom the leadership of the Solto tribe passed.

Adult life 
By the beginning of the 60s of the 19th century, the rivalry between the Russian Empire and the Khanate of Kokand for influence in Central Asia intensified. At this time, the Kokand people intensively began to strengthen their fortresses in the Kyrgyz lands. So, in 1860, only in the Chüy Valley, they concentrated 5,000 . The Russian troops moving south were led by Captain .

At the same time, Baytik Batyr took over the reins of power from the Solto tribe.

The capture of the Pishpek fortress 

The separate skirmishes that took place between the Russian troops and the Kokand sarbaz revealed the advantage of Russian weapons. In the struggle against the Kokand yoke, it was reasonable for the Kyrgyz people to rely on the mighty Russian Empire.

Protest moods among the Kyrgyz of the Chüy Valley especially intensified after the appointment in early 1861 1861 as the governor of the Kokand Khan Rakhmatulla. He imposed additional taxes on the Solto, and held the son of Baytik Batyr Baisal as a hostage in the Pishpek fortress. Rumors about alleged bullying of his son also reached the Batyr.

All objective and subjective factors, as well as foreign policy circumstances, spoke of the brewing of a decisive battle against Kokand dominance. Rahmatullah understood this too. Baytik Batyr's invitations to take part in this or that celebration or commemoration always refused. A convenient case of reprisals against Rahmatullah presented itself only in late August — early September 1862. Having lulled the vigilance of the Kokand governor through his close circle, Baytik Batyr invited him to the feast of circumcision in the vicinity of Pishpek. Rahmatulla arrived on that escorted by reinforced guards in the amount of 60 sarbaz. In which case, he counted on the proximity of the fortress, which was only 8-10 kilometers away.

By the beginning of the feast, Baytik prepared 500 selected horsemen led by Korchu Batyr from the Bolokbay clan, Baigazy and Kokum from the Talkan clan. By the beginning of the meal, the elastics and bridles of the entire Kokand cavalry were cut off.

On a signal given by the leader, his jigits attacked the Kokand people. Rahmatullah himself was helped by his bodyguards to escape. According to eyewitnesses, he had an excellent pacer. Faithful horseman Baytik Batyr Kokum set off after him with a lance at the ready on the famous winner of the races Ker-Kashka. Halfway to the fortress, Kokum caught up with Rahmatulla and plunged a pike into him.

The Kyrgyz surrounded the Pishpek fortress. Due to the fact that they were not able to take it by storm, Baytik Batyr sent his brother Satylgan to Vernyi for help. Russian troops led by Colonel G.A. Kolpakovsky arrived in early October. The siege of the fortress lasted 12 days. It was attended not only by the subjects of Baytik Batyr, who allocated 500 people daily for the destruction of the fortress, but also by the horsemen of the Sarybagysh Jantai Batyr.

Accession of Northern Kyrgyzstan to Russia 
The capture of Pishpek by Baytik Batyr with the help of Russian troops was a decisive event in the course of the voluntary entry of the Kyrgyz tribes of northern Kyrgyzstan into the Russian Empire. This was a wise and far-sighted decision of the Kyrgyz leaders, who soberly assessed the geopolitical circumstances and the national interests of the Kyrgyz people.

After the capture of the Pishpek fortress, the jigits of Baitik Batyr actively participated in the destruction of the Oluya-Ata fortress.

The decisive actions of the baatyr were also supported by his elder brothers Baiseit Batyr and Boshkoy Batyr. Communication with them was maintained by the commander of the Russian detachment in Merki, Colonel M.G. Chernyaev.

In 1867, Baytik Batyr, as part of a delegation of the peoples of Central Asia, was invited to St. Petersburg. He was given the rank of captain of the Russian army. He was awarded the Order of St. Stanislaus and a ring with a diamond.

Legacy 

In the capital of Kyrgyzstan, one of the main streets is named after him.
The village next to the family cemetery of the descendants of Kanai Batyr bears the name of Baytik Batyr.
The mountain next to his headquarters is also called Baytik-baspoltogu.

References 

1886 deaths
Ethnic Kyrgyz people (individuals)
1823 births